Pipers Creek is a  urban stream that is located in the Broadview and Blue Ridge neighborhoods of Seattle, Washington, in the United States.

Course and features

The entire length of the creek is within the boundaries of Carkeek Park, and its mouth is at Puget Sound.

Its tributaries are Venema Creek and Mohlendorph Creek. The creek was renamed "Piper's" by white settler A. W. Piper, but now apostrophe is often left out. The Duwamish tribe called the creek "Dropped Down" (Lushootseed: qWátub).

Daylighted Mohlendorph Creek is mostly within the boundaries of Carkeek Park. It receives Venema Creek and empties into Pipers Creek near the mouth on Puget Sound.

Most of daylighted Venema Creek is within Carkeek Park.  It empties into Mohlendorph Creek, just west of the Carkeek Park Environmental Education Center.

See also 
 Boeing Creek
 Daylighting (streams)
 List of rivers of Washington
 Water resources

References

Bibliography

Further reading 

 Seattle Parks and Recreation "Pipers Creek Watershed", GIF.

Broadview, Seattle
Landforms of Seattle
Rivers of King County, Washington
Rivers of Washington (state)
Subterranean rivers of the United States